Flybanger is a Canadian metal band from Vancouver. They are best known for their 2001 major label release Headtrip to Nowhere.

History 
The band started out performing under the name Jar. They released two CDs under that name, including Knott Skull in 1998. The
song "Regional Pump" from their 1996 debut Harsh and Discord appeared in the credits for the Canadian science fiction film Laserhawk, released in 1997.

Because there was more than one other band with the same name, the band members decided to rename their group Flybanger.  They released a five track EP titled Outlived in 2000.

In 2001 the band released an album, Headtrip to Nowhere, as Flybanger through Sony Music in 2001, which was produced by Matt Wallace (Faith No More, The Replacements, Deftones, Maroon 5, etc.).  Playing and the album were singer Garth Allen, guitarist Bryan Fratesi, Tom Macdonald  on bass and Rob Wade on drums. The singles released from Headtrip To Nowhere were "Cavalry", "Radical" and "Blind World". The latter was also used on the soundtrack for the motion picture Dracula 2000.

The band toured in support of the album.

In 2003 the band broke up. Original Lyricist and lead singer Mark Simson was released as part of the break up. In 2005, Rob Wade (drums) and Garth Allen (vocals) joined Kill Rhythm, a band started by Rob Thiessen (formerly of Noise Therapy). In March 2009, following the breakup of Kill Rhythm, both Wade and Allen turned their focus to the heavy acoustic rock project, The Thick of It.

In 2013, the band released an album under their original name of Jar. containing re-recordings of several of their older songs.

Members 
Garth Allen – vocals
Bryan Fratesi – guitar
Tom MacDonald – bass, vocals
Rob Wade – drums, percussion
Chris Smith – bass

Discography as Flybanger 
 Outlived EP (Gotham Records – 2000)

 Headtrip to Nowhere (Columbia Records – 2001)

Discography as Jar. 
 Harsh And Discord EP (self released – 1996)

 Knott Skull (Factor Records – 1998)

 Jar (self released – 2013)

 2003 Demos (self released – 2020)

Discography as Jarr. 
 Jarr EP (self released – 2003)

References 

Canadian alternative metal musical groups